A ghost word is a word published in a dictionary or similarly authoritative reference work even though it had not previously had any meaning or been used intentionally. A ghost word generally originates from a typographical or linguistic error, taken as an unfamiliar word by readers.

Once authoritatively published, a ghost word occasionally may be copied widely and enter legitimate usage, or it may eventually be expunged by more fastidious lexicographers.

Origin
The term was coined by Professor Walter William Skeat in his annual address as president of the Philological Society in 1886: 

It turned out that "kimes" was a misprint for "knives", but the word gained currency for some time. A more drastic example followed, also cited in Skeat's address:

One edition of The Monastery containing the misprint was published by the Edinburgh University Press in 1820.

More examples

In his address, Skeat exhibited about 100 more specimens that he had collected.

Other examples include:
The supposed Homeric Greek word  = "woman", which arose thus: In Iliad Book 1 line 6 is the phrase  = "two (i.e. Achilles and Agamemnon) stood apart making strife". However someone unfamiliar with dual number verb inflections read it as  = "two making strife because of a stētē", and they guessed that  meant the woman Briseis who was the subject of the strife, influenced by the fact that nouns ending with eta are usually feminine.
The placename Sarum, which arose by misunderstanding of the abbreviation Sar~ used in a medieval manuscript to mean some early form such as "Sarisberie" (= Salisbury).
As an example of an editing mistake, "dord"  was defined as a noun meaning density (mass per unit volume). When the second edition of  Webster's New International Dictionary was being prepared, an index card that read "D or d" with reference to the word "density" was incorrectly misfiled as a word instead of an abbreviation. The entry existed in more than one printing from 1934 to 1947.
A Concise Dictionary of Pronunciation accidentally included the nonexistent word testentry (evidently a feature of work-in-progress), with spurious British and US pronunciations as though it rhymed with pedantry.
The OED explains the ghost word phantomnation as "Appearance of a phantom; illusion. Error for phantom nation". Alexander Pope's (1725) translation of the Odyssey originally said, "The Phantome-nations of the dead". Richard Paul Jodrell's (1820) Philology of the English Language, which omitted hyphens from compounds, entered it as one word, "Phantomnation, a multitude of spectres". Lexicographers copied this error into various dictionaries, such as, "Phantomnation, illusion. Pope." (Worcester, 1860, Philology of the English Language), and "Phantomnation, appearance as of a phantom; illusion. (Obs. and rare.) Pope." (Webster, 1864, An American dictionary of the English language).
The Japanese word kusege (compounding kuse  "habit; vice" and  ke "hair", "frizzy hair") was mistranslated as "vicious hair" in the authoritative Kenkyūsha's New Japanese-English Dictionary from the first edition (1918) to the fourth (1974), and corrected in the fifth edition (2003) "twisted [kinky, frizzy] hair; hair that stands up". This phantom word was not merely an unnoticed lexicographical error, generations of dictionary users copied the mistake. For example, a Tokyo hospital of cosmetic surgery had a long-running display advertisement in the Asian edition of Newsweek that read, "Kinky or vicious hair may be changed to a lovely, glossy hair" . This hair-straightening ad was jokingly used in the "Kinky Vicious" title of a 2011 Hong Kong iPhoneography photo exhibition.
 The JIS X 0208 standard, the most widespread system to handle Japanese language with computers since 1978, has entries for 12 kanji that have no known use and were probably included by mistake (for example ). They are called  (yūrei moji, "ghost characters") and are still supported by most computer systems (see: JIS X 0208#Kanji from unknown sources).
 Hsigo, an apparently erroneous output from optical character recognition software for "hsiao", a creature from Chinese mythology. The typographical error appeared in several limited-audience publications but spread around the World Wide Web after the creation of a Wikipedia article about the term (which has since been corrected), due to its numerous mirrors and forks.
 In his book Beyond Language: Adventures in Word and Thought, Dmitri Borgmann shows how feamyng, a purported collective noun for ferrets which appeared in several dictionaries, is actually the result of a centuries-long chain of typographical or misread-handwriting errors (from BUSYNESS to BESYNESS to FESYNES to FESNYNG to FEAMYNG).

Speculative examples
Many neologisms, including those that eventually develop into established usages, are of obscure origin, and some might well have originated as ghost words through illiteracy, such as the term "okay". However, establishing the true origin often is not possible, partly for lack of documentation, and sometimes through obstructive efforts on the part of pranksters. The most popular etymology of the word pumpernickel bread - that Napoleon described it as "C'est pain pour Nicole!", being only fit for his horse - is thought to be a deliberate hoax. "Quiz" also has been associated with apparently deliberate false etymology. All these words and many more have remained in common usage, but they may well have been ghost words in origin.

Distinguished from back-formation
A recent, incorrect use of the term "ghost word" refers to coining a new word inferred from a real word by falsely applying an etymological rule. The correct term for such a derivation is back-formation, a word that has been established since the late 19th century. An example is "beforemath" derived from "aftermath", having an understandable meaning but not a commonly accepted word. A back-formation cannot become a ghost word; as a rule it would clash with Skeat's precise definition, which requires that the word forms have "no meaning".

See also
Corruption (linguistics)
Dord
False etymology
Fictitious entry
Funistrada, a fictional food name, created as a control item in a survey
Folk etymology
Trap street – a fictitious street inserted into maps for copyright protection

References

External links

  Transactions of the Philological Society

Linguistic error
Lexis (linguistics)
Vocabulary